Songs from the Crystal Cave is the debut album from actor, musician, and martial artist Steven Seagal, released in 2005 on Nonsolo Blues and Warner Strategic Marketing. Seagal is credited with "Lead Vocals, Rhythm and Lead Guitar" and appears on the cover and throughout the liner notes emotively playing and posing with a guitar. The style can be described as "outsider country-meets-world music-meets-Aikido." Many of the songs reflect Seagal's esoteric Buddhist and spiritualist stance while also incorporating standard song tropes about relationships and other themes.

The album features a mix of musical genres, including rock, reggae, and country music. Musicians collaborating on this album include Stevie Wonder and Lady Saw.

Seagal has sometimes provided soundtrack music for some of his movies. The track "Don't You Cry", among others was featured in the film Into the Sun.

Reviews and responses 

Allmusic published a mixed review, highlighting the album's mixture of styles and emotional tones from song to song for criticism as being slipshod and haphazard. However, the review also credited the album for being "endearing in its own way" and presenting the listener with a "good-vibes experience".

Track listing 
 "Girl It's Alright" - 3:52 (Steven Seagal, Greg Barnhill)
 "Don't You Cry" - 4:59 (Seagal, Barnhill)
 "Music" - 4:15 (Seagal, Patrick George Barrett)
 "Better Man" - 4:29 (Seagal, Barnhill)
 "Route 23" - 4:32 (Seagal)
 "My God" - 3:59 (Seagal)
 "Lollipop" - 4:36 (Cover of "My Boy Lollipop." Writing credited to Seagal & Shaun Fisher)
 "Not for Sale" - 4:58 (Seagal, Fisher)
 "Dance" - 3:34 (Seagal, Fisher)
 "Jealousy" - 4:22 (Seagal, Marion Hall)
 "War" - 3:47 (Seagal, Cleve Laing)
 "Strut" - 3:06 (Seagal, Hall, Saw)
 "Goree" - 6:00 (Seagal)
 "The Light" - 4:55 (Seagal)

Personnel 
 Steven Seagal: Vocals, Rhythm & Lead Guitar, Drums, Percussion, Clay Pot
 Greg Barnhill: Acoustic Guitars
 Al Anderson: Rhythm Guitar
 Tommy K.: Acoustic, Rhythm & Wah-Wah Guitars
 Russ DeSalvo: Acoustic & Electric Guitars, Synthesizers
 Stevie Wonder: Harmonica
 Marty Grebb: Keyboards, Organ
 Veit Renn: Keyboards
 Patrick Carroll: Bass, Drum & Percussion Programming
 Habib Faye: Bass, Keyboards, Drum & Percussion Programming
 Shaun Fisher: Keyboards, Bass, Drums, Percussion
 Rhonda Smith: Bass
 Frank Valardi: Drums
 Babakar: African Drums
 T.H. Subash Chandran: Ethnic Percussion, Bowls, Tabla, Jew's Harp
 Remi Kabaka: Talking Drum
 Mani Subramaniam: Violin
 Lady Saw, "Lieutenant Stitchie": DJ
 Tony Rebel: Rap
 Rose Banks, Sharon Bryant, Dana Calitri, Ripley Fairchild, Lisa Frazier, Curtis King, Michael Okri, Janice Brocking-Renn: Vocal Backing

References 

2005 debut albums
Steven Seagal albums
Albums recorded at Metalworks Studios